Begg (from Gaelic Beag: little, young, small of stature) is a Scottish surname. Notable people with the surname include:

Alexander Charles Begg (1912–1995), New Zealand radiologist and historian
Alistair Begg (b. 1952), Scottish minister in the United States
Anne Begg (b. 1955), Scottish Labour politician
Chris Begg (b. 1979), Canadian baseball player
Dale Begg-Smith (b. 1991) Canadian-Australian skier and entrepreneur
Ean Begg (1929–2018), Scottish army officer, esotericist and analytical psychologist
Gordon Begg (1868-1954), British stage and film actor, active in Hollywood
Ferdinand Begg (1847–1926), Scottish politician
Heather Begg (1932–2009), New Zealand mezzo-soprano
Ian Begg (1911–1989), Scottish Episcopalian prelate
Jean Begg (1886-1971), New Zealand welfare worker and feminist
James Begg (1808–1883), Scottish minister
James Livingstone Begg (1874-1958), Scottish geologist
John Begg, British architect in India
Konrad Begg (b.1972), Scottish film director 
Moazzam Begg (b. 1968), British/Pakistani held by the U.S. as a terror suspect
Neil Begg (1915–1995), New Zealand paediatrician
Si Begg (b. 1972), British DJ
Varyl Begg Sir (1908–1995), Admiral of the Fleet, British WWII veteran, Chief-of-Staff
Victor Begg (b.1947), Indian-born American philanthropist
William Begg (1821–1889), Scottish merchant captain who settled in Adelaide, South Australia

See also
Beg (disambiguation)
Beggs (disambiguation)